Julius Charles Gilbertson (June 28, 1875 – February 24, 1933) was an American jurist and politician.

Born in Eau Claire, Wisconsin, Gilbertson graduated from the University of Wisconsin in 1896 and was also admitted to the Wisconsin bar in 1896. Gilbertson practiced law in Eau Claire. In 1898, Gilbertson was elected Eau Claire municipal court judge. He also served as Eau Claire County district attorney. In 1911, Gilbertson served in the Wisconsin State Assembly and was a Republican. Gilbertson died at his home in Eau Claire, Wisconsin from a heart ailment.

Notes

External links

1875 births
1933 deaths
Politicians from Eau Claire, Wisconsin
University of Wisconsin–Madison alumni
Wisconsin lawyers
Wisconsin state court judges
Republican Party members of the Wisconsin State Assembly